Isigny may refer to:

 Isigny-le-Buat, in the Manche département, France
 Isigny-sur-Mer, in the Calvados département, France